Runnner is the stage name of American indie rock musician Noah Weinman. Weinman is based in Los Angeles.

History
Weinman began releasing music under the stage name Runnner in 2017, when he self-released his debut album titled Awash. After the release, Runner released his first EP in 2020 titled One of One. These releases caught the attention of Boston based record label Run for Cover Records, who signed him to the label in 2021. Upon signing to the label, Runnner announced plans to release a new album, titled Always Repeating. The album consisted of reworked tracks he had originally recorded from his debut album and EP. The album was released on July 16, 2021. The album features contributions from fellow Los Angeles musician Hellen Ballentine, known professionally as Skullcrusher. In 2023, Weinman announced his debut full-length album of all new material. The album, Like Dying Stars, We're Reaching Out, was released on February 17, 2023.

Discography
Studio albums
Like Dying Stars, We're Reaching Out (2023, Run for Cover)
Always Repeating (2022, Run for Cover)
Awash (2017, self-released)
EPs
One of One (2020, self-released)
Fan On (2019)

References

American indie rock musicians